Phyllomedusa tetraploidea is a species of frog in the subfamily Phyllomedusinae. It is found in northern Argentina (Misiones Province), extreme southeastern Paraguay (Itapúa Department), and southern Brazil (São Paulo and Paraná states). It also occurs in secondary forest and pastures. The eggs are deposited in leaf nests above the water in permanent forest pools; the tadpoles develop in the pools. It is a common species in Brazil and Argentina. Habitat loss caused by agricultural activities is a threat to it. It is present in several protected areas.

References

tetraploidea
Amphibians of Argentina
Amphibians of Brazil
Amphibians of Paraguay
Amphibians described in 1992
Taxonomy articles created by Polbot